Fritz Achterberg (2 November 1880 – 12 October 1971) was a German stage and film actor.

Selected filmography
 Rose on the Heath (1916)
 Augen (1919)
 The Swabian Maiden (1919)
 Anna Karenina (1919)
 Bettler GmbH (1919)
 Telephon 1313 (1921)
 Hamlet (1921)
 The False Dimitri (1922)
 The Doll Maker of Kiang-Ning (1923)

Bibliography
 Jung, Uli & Schatzberg, Walter. Beyond Caligari: The Films of Robert Wiene. Berghahn Books, 1999.

External links

1880 births
1971 deaths
German male film actors
German male stage actors
German male silent film actors
Male actors from Berlin
20th-century German male actors